Jeremiah James Harty S. J. (November 5, 1853 – October 29, 1927) was an American prelate of the Catholic Church. He served as the 26th archbishop of the Archdiocese of Manila in the Philippines from 1903 to 1916.  He later served as bishop (with the personal title of archbishop) of the Diocese of Omaha in Nebraska  from 1916 until his death in 1927.

Biography

Early life 
Jeremiah Harty was born in St. Louis, Missouri, to Andrew and Julia (née Murphy) Harty, who were Irish immigrants. He was educated by the Christian Brothers in grade school and by the Jesuits in high school. He attended St. Louis University, from where he graduated in 1872. He studied theology at St. Vincent's College in Cape Girardeau.

Priesthood 
Harty was ordained to the priesthood for the Archdiocese of St. Louis by Archbishop Patrick Ryan on April 28, 1878. His first assignment was as assistant pastor of St. Lawrence O'Toole Parish in St. Louis. He then served a pastoral role at St. Bridget Parish, where he remained until he became founding pastor of St. Leo Parish in 1888.

Archbishop of Manila 
On June 6, 1903, Harty was appointed Archbishop of Manila by Pope Leo XIII. He was the first American to be named to that position. He received his episcopal consecration on August 15, 1903 in Rome from Cardinal Francesco Satolli, with Archbishops Diomede Panici and Amilcare Tonietti serving as co-consecrators, in Rome.

During his term, Harty was increasingly troubled by the propagation of the Protestant faith in the Philippines, which was being introduced by the Thomasites, and which was gaining a foothold among Filipinos because of the strong anti-friar sentiments that existed at that time.  Due to the lack of Catholic educational institutions in the country, Harty, an alumnus of a Christian Brother school in St. Louis, Missouri, appealed to the Superior-General of the Institute of the Brothers of the Christian Schools in 1905 for the establishment of a De La Salle school in the Philippines.  However, Harty's request was denied due to lack of funds.  Nonetheless, Harty continued to appeal for the establishment of additional Catholic schools in the country to Pope Pius X including, among others, St. Theresa's College Manila.  On March 10, 1911, the La Salle Generalate sent Brothers Blimond Pierre, Aloysius Gonzaga, and Augusto Correge to the Philippines, where they established De La Salle College in Paco, the first Christian Brother school in the country.

Bishop of Omaha 
On May 16, 1916, Harty was appointed bishop of what was then Diocese of Omaha with the personal title of archbishop.  He filled the vacancy of Bishop Richard Scannell, who died on January 8, 1916.  In 1917, Harty expressed skepticism of Father Edward J. Flanagan and his establishment of Boys Town, a home for troubled boys in Boys Town, Nebraska. However, Harty would later endorse the goals of Boys Town. The actor Minor Watson portrayed the bishop of  Omaha in the 1938 film Boys Town.

On October 29, 1927, Jeremiah Harty died at age 73.

References

1853 births
1927 deaths
Clergy from St. Louis
American expatriates in the Philippines
Roman Catholic archbishops of Manila
20th-century Roman Catholic archbishops in the Philippines
Roman Catholic bishops of Omaha
20th-century Roman Catholic archbishops in the United States
Roman Catholic Archdiocese of Manila